Mamuka Kikaleishvili (10 August 1960 – 3 May 2000  was a Georgian actor and film director.

Biography
Born in Tbilisi in 1960, he graduated from Tbilisi Theatre Institute (1981) and worked for Marjanishvili National Academic Drama Theatre until 1984. In 1984, he was employed by the Georgia Film studio. Throughout his career, Mamuka Kikaleishvili performed in leading and secondary roles in a number of films produced in USSR, Russia, Georgia, Azerbaijan, Ukraine, and Uzbekistan. At the 1988 international festival in Gabrovo, Bulgaria, he won a prize for the best comedy actor. In 1992, he made his debut as a director and co-directed Fallen Angel (Georgia) with Levon Uzunian.

Later in his life, he worked for the Georgian Embassy in Moscow where he died in 2000.

Filmography
Old Hags   —  Russia, 2000
Instead of Me  —  Russia, 2000
The Princess on a Bean  —  Ukraine, 1997 
Cafe in Lemon  Russia, 1994
Weather Is Good on Deribasovskaya, It Rains Again on Brighton Beach —  Russia, 1992
Bravo, Giordano Bruno — Georgia, 1993
Zero Option   — Uzbekistan, 1992
Wandering Stars  — USSR, 1991
Crooks—  USSR, 1990
Passport — USSR/France, 1990
Girl from Rouen Nicknamed Doughnut —  USSR, 1989
The Scoundrel — Azerbaijan SSR, 1988
The Life of Don Quixote and Sancho —  Georgian SSR/Spain, 1988
Gentlemen Adventurers — Georgian SSR, 1985
An Unusual Trip —  Georgian SSR, 1983

References

External links

Male film actors from Georgia (country)
Male stage actors from Georgia (country)
Soviet male film actors
Soviet male stage actors
Burials at Kuntsevo Cemetery
Actors from Tbilisi
1960 births
2000 deaths
20th-century male actors from Georgia (country)